Cephalothrips is a genus of thrips in the subfamily Phlaeothripinae.

Species
 Cephalothrips albostriatus
 Cephalothrips brachychaitus
 Cephalothrips coxalis
 Cephalothrips fuscus
 Cephalothrips hesperus
 Cephalothrips longicapitus
 Cephalothrips merrilli
 Cephalothrips monilicornis

References

External links 

 
 Cephalothrips at insectoid.info

Thrips genera
Phlaeothripidae